The Montrose Football Club is an Australian rules football club located in Montrose, Victoria. They play in Division 1 of the Eastern Football League.

History
The Montrose Football Club was reformed in 1964 and started in the 2nd Division reserves. The following year the played seniors in 3rd Division. Initially the club struggled but in the late 1970s the club hit its stride and made the Grand Final in 1979 and winning it in 1981.

Promoted to 2nd division in 1982, the club was a strong performer playing in four Grand Finals before winning one in 1992.
A brief stint in 1st Division for 3 years before dropping back into 2nd Division until it won the premiership in 2013.

Premierships
 1981, 1992, 2013

Runners-up
 1979, 1982, 1983, 1989, 1991, 1996, 2004, 2011, 2012

References

External links
  Official club website
 Official Eastern Football League website

Eastern Football League (Australia) clubs
Australian rules football clubs established in 1964
1964 establishments in Australia
Sport in the Shire of Yarra Ranges